A Spot of Bother is a 1938 British comedy film directed by David MacDonald and starring Robertson Hare, Alfred Drayton, Sandra Storme and Kathleen Joyce. The film is a farce in which a bishop unwisely decides to loan the cathedral funds to a dubious businessman. Meanwhile, his secretary is involved with smuggled goods. It was shot at Pinewood Studios and adapted from a play by Vernon Sylvaine. The film's sets were designed by Wilfred Arnold.

Cast
 Robertson Hare as Mr Rudd
 Alfred Drayton as Mr Watney
 Sandra Storme as Sadie
 Kathleen Joyce as Margaret Watney
 Ruth Maitland as Mrs Watney
 Gordon James as Joe
 Robert Hale as Colonel Pigge
 Fewlass Llewellyn as Bishop of Barchester
 Drusilla Wills as Miss Hagworthy
 Julian Vedey as Scheipman
 O. B. Clarence as Butler  
 Edie Martin as An Occasional Bar-Lady  
 Hay Petrie as McTavish the Golf Club Official

Critical reception
TV Guide called the film a "decent comedy with some good character performances."

References

External links
 

1938 films
1938 comedy films
British comedy films
Films directed by David MacDonald (director)
Films shot at Pinewood Studios
Films produced by Anthony Havelock-Allan
Films set in England
British black-and-white films
Films scored by Percival Mackey
1930s English-language films
1930s British films